Marizza Alejandra Faría Servin (born 20 August 1983) is a Paraguayan handball player for club Liberbank Gijón and the Paraguay national team.

She represented Paraguay at the 2013 World Women's Handball Championship in Serbia, where the Paraguayan team placed 21st.

In 2021 she was the first handballer to play a professional league match alongside her daughter, Yeruti Faría in the spanish handball league

Individual Awards
2017 Pan American Women's Handball Championship: All Star Team Playmaker

References

Paraguayan female handball players
1983 births
Living people
Expatriate handball players
Paraguayan expatriate sportspeople in Spain
Sportspeople from Asunción